Kapiti Island is an island about  off the west coast of the lower North Island of New Zealand. Its name has been used since 1989 by the Kapiti Coast District Council, which includes towns such as Paekakariki, Raumati South, Paraparaumu and Waikanae.

The island is separated from the North Island by the Rauoterangi Channel. The highest point on the island is Tūteremoana, . The seaward (west) side of the island is particularly rocky and has high cliffs, some hundreds of metres high, that drop straight into the sea. The cliffs are subject to very strong prevailing westerly winds and the scrubby vegetation that grows there is low and stunted by the harsh environmental conditions. A cross-section of the island would show almost a right-angled triangle, revealing its origins from lying on a fault line (part of the same ridge as the Tararua Range). The island's vegetation is dominated by scrub and forest of kohekohe, tawa, and kanuka. Most of the forest is regenerating after years of burn-offs and farming, but some areas of original bush remain, with  trees.

Name and etymology

The full original name for the island is Te Waewae-Kapiti-o-Tara-rāua-ko-Rangitāne, meaning "the boundary of Tara and Rangitāne" and referring to it as a place where the rohe (territories) of Ngāi Tara (now known as Muaūpoko) and Rangitāne iwi adjoined each other. The word kapiti (meaning 'to be joined') is spelt without a macron, and is unrelated to the word kāpiti (cabbage). The island does not have an official name, but is recorded on topographical maps and hence in the New Zealand Gazetteer as Kapiti Island. In 2010 the Māori Language Commission acknowledged that, while the ordinary word kapiti does not have a macron, iwi of the Kāpiti region have evidence from history and local pronunciation that the place name is a variant form of āpiti, and that Kāpiti (with a macron) is correct.

The island also became known by Māori as Motu Rongonui, or the "famous island". When James Cook visited New Zealand during his  1770 survey, he called it Entry Island,
but Cook's name did not come into common use.

History

The Kapiti Coast region has been occupied by Māori since the 12th century. Around the year 1150, Māori navigator Whātonga of the waka Kurahaupō divided the country into two sections: land from the southern tip of Kapiti Island north was given to his son Tautoki and his ancestors, who became Rangitāne iwi, and from the southern tip south was given to his son Tara and ancestors (Ngāi Tara, now known as Muaūpoko). The traditional name for the island refers to this division between Ngāi Tara and Rangitāne.

The island was surveyed in 1770 during the first voyage of James Cook. In the early 1800s, the island was in the rohe of Muaūpoko. Te Rauparaha of Ngāti Toa saw the advantage of settling on Kapiti Island, after noticing how Western ships frequented the Cook Strait area. In 1822, Te Rauparaha led a migration of Ngāti Toa from Kawhia Harbour to settle on Kapiti Island and Waikanae, securing it from Muaūpoko in 1823. The tribe regularly sailed in canoes on raiding journeys up to the Whanganui River and down to Marlborough. In the Battle of Waiorua (1824) the Ngāti Toa destroyed a force of 2,000 mainland warriors who had landed at the northern end of Kapiti in an attempt to capture the island.

Te Rauparaha encouraged European ships to visit Kapiti, which by 1830 became a centre for the New Zealand flax trade. In the 1830s and 1840s, the island became one of the most developed areas in the country for whaling, due to the South Taranaki Bight and Cook Strait being whale nurseries. During whaling times 2,000 people were based on the island. Oil was melted from the blubber and shipped to America for use in machinery before petroleum was used. Five whaling stations were established on Kapiti, with three additional stations on the offshore islets of Tokomapuna, Motungarara and Tahoramaurea to the south-east. During this period, the island was forested with rātā, kahikatea and rimu.

After the collapse of the whaling industry in the 1840s, whalers and their families left the island. By 1850, no Ngāti Toa permanently lived on the island, occasionally visiting for the island's resources. During this period, the land was leased to European farmers and was deforested. Between 1874 and the 1890s, the Māori Land Court partitioned the island into blocks, primarily owned by Western Maori MP Wiremu Parata and his family members. In the 1890s, the Wellington Acclimatisation Society requested that Alfred Ross, a leaseholder and sheep farmer on the island, turn his farm into a game reserve, releasing quail, pheasants and later possums onto the island.

By 1895, the government had begun considering making Kapiti Island into a wildlife reserve, due to the losses in native flora and fauna caused by introduced predators and deforestation across mainland New Zealand. Parata and his family members protested these plans, and in 1896 stated that they had no intention of selling the land to the government – by this time, Kapiti Island was the only part of the Ngāti Toa rohe still in Māori ownership. In 1897, the government passed the Kapiti Island Public Reserve Act, preventing land blocks on Kapiti Island being sold into private hands, in order to create a nature reserve in the future.

By the 1900s, most of the island had been acquired by the New Zealand government for the reserve, except for a section in the north. As the land could no longer be leased to European farmers, the land was farmed directly by Ngāti Toa as a sheep farm by the Webber family. In 1934, many oil-covered and dead seabirds were discovered on the island and the mainland beaches after an oil spill or dumping event. The Webber family continued to farm on the island until the 1950s, most land being sold in 1967, however Ngāti Toa retain some land and rights of access to the island.

In 1987 the Department of Conservation (DOC) took over administration of the island. In the 1980s and 1990s efforts were made to return the island to a natural state. First, sheep and possums were removed, then, in an action few thought possible for an island of its size, rats were eradicated in 1998. In 2003 the anonymous Biodiversity Action Group claimed to have released 11 possums on the island, but no evidence of such possums was found.

Present day

The island is the site of Kapiti Island Nature Reserve and adjoins the Kapiti Marine Reserve. Most of it is in New Zealand Crown ownership.

The island is home to a number of native birds, mostly re-introduced. These include takahe, North Island kōkako, brown teal, stitchbird (hihi), North Island saddleback (tieke), tomtit (miromiro), fantail (piwakawaka), morepork (ruru), weka and North Island robin (toutouwai). The brown kiwi and little spotted kiwi were released on the island between 1890 and 1910, and the island is now the stronghold for the latter species. Rat eradication has led to increases in red-fronted parakeets, North Island robin, bellbirds, and saddlebacks and the island is considered one of New Zealand's most important sites for bird recovery, as well as a major breeding site, for seabirds. In April 2005, the critically endangered short-tailed bat was introduced to the island from a threatened population in the Tararuas, providing them with a separate, safer habitat.

Owing to the proximity of Wellington, there are regular tourist trips to the island, limited to 160 people per day, and it is an especially popular destination for birdwatchers. Having no natural mammalian predators, New Zealand birds are trusting, and a visitor to the island is likely to be rewarded by seeing a number of different species.

On 14 June 2007, one of the buildings at the Department of Conservation ranger station caught fire, sparking a major emergency operation to prevent the spread of fire to the native bush. Thirty firefighters were flown to the island and managed to contain the blaze, preventing serious damage to the ecosystem.

A stoat, an introduced mustelid responsible for decimating the bird life in New Zealand, was seen on the island in December 2010, and by August the next year the Department of Conservation had killed three of them. It is thought that they could not have swum the five-kilometre stretch of open sea from the Kapiti Coast.

Kapiti Island is one of Wellington region's “coastal habitats of significance for indigenous birds”. It provides predator free nesting habitat to little blue penguins, red-billed gulls, white-fronted terns and the reef heron. A further four Nationally Threatened or At Risk species occur on the coast of Kapiti Island including the black shag, the Caspian tern, the pied shag and the variable oystercatcher.

See also 
 List of islands of New Zealand

References

Further reading

External links

 Kapiti Island Nature Reserve, Department of Conservation

Islands of the Wellington Region
Kapiti Coast District
Island restoration
Whaling in New Zealand
Whaling stations in New Zealand
Nature reserves in New Zealand
Wildlife sanctuaries of New Zealand
Protected areas of the Wellington Region